George Merryweather was a British doctor and inventor.

Inventions
In 1832 George wrote his first essay "The means of maintaining uniform temperature and supporting fire without the agency of wood or coal". He invented the so-called "Platina Lamp", which was described to "keep burning for a fortnight on an economical mixture of pure alcohol and whisky, at a cost of one penny for eight hours".

But his most remarkable invention was the "Tempest Prognosticator"—a weather predicting device also called "The Leech Barometer". It had great success and caused a sensation when it was put on show at the Great Exhibition, so in 1850-1 Merryweather wrote "An essay explanatory of the tempest prognosticator in the Great Exhibition 1851".  At this time he was an honorary curator of Whitby Philosophical Society.
After the success of the "Tempest Prognosticator" at the Great Exhibition, Merryweather tried to persuade the British government to install his device at ports around the British coast. However, the government reacted coolly to the proposal and the Meteorological Department insisted on using barometers and weather charts instead.

Modern science considers Merryweather's methods underlying the "Tempest Prognosticator"  to be unproven.

Merryweather referred to the leeches as his "jury of philosophical councilors" and explains that the twelve bottles were placed in a circle in order that his "little comrades" might see one another and "not endure the affliction of solitary confinement".

Career as a doctor of medicine
In 1835 Merryweather finished studying in MD University of Edinburgh. In 1840 he worked as a family doctor in Whitby, and by 1849 he was a surgeon.

References

4. Mechanics' Magazine, Register, Journal and Gazette: 9 June 1832, no.461. [George] Merryweather's Platina Lamp.

External links
Tempest Prognosticator

1794 births
1870 deaths
People from Burley in Wharfedale
British inventors